Yawunik is an extinct genus of Cambrian megacheiran ("Great appendage" arthropod) known from the Burgess Shale in Canada (Marble Canyon locality). The type species has been named Yawunik kootenayi after the Kootenay, both a geographic area (and National Park, where the fossil was found) and North American First Nation, also known as the Ktunaxa. Yawunik is the name of a primordial sea monster in Ktunaxa mythology. The fossil dates back to 508 million years ago.

Description 
It had four eyes, in the anteriormost position of the head, and lateral eyes are larger. Yawunik differs from other leanchoilid such as Leanchoilia by having numerous teeth on great appendage, and probably it used great appendages to grasp prey.

References

Megacheira
Burgess Shale animals
Prehistoric arthropod genera
Fossil taxa described in 2015
Cambrian arthropods
Cambrian genus extinctions